Threesome (stylised as threesome) is a British television sitcom written by Tom MacRae and starring Stephen Wight, Amy Huberman and Emun Elliott. The series is focused around three friends—Alice, Mitch and Richie—who return home from a night out celebrating Alice's birthday and end up having a threesome, which results in Alice getting pregnant. Instead of getting an abortion, the three friends decide to raise the baby as a trio. The series began airing on 17 October 2011 on Comedy Central and Comedy Central HD. It is the first original scripted comedy commissioned by Comedy Central and is produced by Big Talk Productions.

In February 2012, it was confirmed that Comedy Central had renewed the show for a second series. Although this included the possibility of a 22-episode third series, this did not happen.

The show was remade in Finland in 2017, as Kolmistaan.

Premise
Threesome is a sitcom about three inseparable friends on the verge of turning 30. Alice (Amy Huberman) lives with her boyfriend Mitch (Stephen Wight) and their gay best friend Richie (Emun Elliott). Together they form three points of an unlikely triangle, living, laughing and larging it together. After a big birthday party for Alice, they end up having an unplanned threesome during which Alice becomes pregnant. After discovering that he is infertile, Mitch tells Richie that he is the baby's biological father. They then decide to ditch the party lifestyle, have the baby, and raise her as a coparenting threesome.

Characters and cast

Main characters
 Alice Heston (Amy Huberman) is the female lead. Alice's long-term friendship with Richie leads to her relationship with boyfriend Mitch.
 Mitch Ennis (Stephen Wight) meets Richie at his brother's funeral, and the two become friends. A blind date leads to Mitch and Alice dating.
 Richie Valentine (Emun Elliott): Best friends with Alice (since university) and Mitch, but unable to commit despite an active love life.
 Lily Owen Valentine-Ennis: is the trio's baby whom Alice gives birth to in the last episode of the first series. She is to be one of the main cast in the second series. Her characteristics are currently unknown.

Supporting roles

 Lorraine Heston (Pauline McLynn): a self-created glamour-puss and a bit of a nightmare control freak. She loves her daughter Alice dearly, but that love more often than not expresses itself as a domineering cattiness. Lorraine is all about the tan and the chatter and loves a good party, but behind the champagne bubbles the claws are out. Lorraine is wealthy and lives in Tenerife most of the year, where she flirts with boys, tolerates Alice's father Malcolm, and drinks way, way too much.
 Sue Ennis (Paddy Navin): a woman who couldn't be more like her son Mitch, or any closer to him; two peas in a pod who still love each other's company. Sue is down to earth, unpretentious and incredibly caring – as well as charmingly sentimental and a bit of a motor-mouth. Of all the mums, she's the least demanding, and will probably end up being far and away the best babysitter.
 Jenny Rouse (Joanna Roth): Richie's mum couldn't be less like Sue to look at. Jenny models herself on Anna Wintour; immaculate fashions and flawless styling, and is a design icon in her own right. Well spoken and perfectly poised, Jenny is every inch a lady – but she's not above chatting up boys on Richie's behalf. Jenny is desperate for Richie to find someone special and give her a gorgeous son-in-law to coo over.
 Dave (Adam Garcia): Richie's boyfriend.

Episodes

Series 1 (2011)

Series 2 (2012)

Reception
The series has received a mostly positive critical reaction. Actor Russell Tovey praised the series. Catriona Wightman, writing for Digital Spy, also praised the series, coming to the conclusion that "it's really rather good indeed." The British Comedy Guide said "after the double-bill opener, Threesome has made a fantastic start. The potentially quite unlikeable situation and characters have proved to be anything but, and some great set-piece lines and scenes really made us laugh out loud. We found it thoroughly enjoyable from start to finish, and can't wait for the rest of the series." Writing for The Daily Telegraph, Catherine Gee said "Threesome throws up some funny moments and there's plenty of good chemistry between its stars." In a slightly more negative-mixed-positive review, Lucy Mangan, writing for The Guardian, said "the jokes are weak but when it's not trying to be funny, Threesome is very funny." Writing a negative review, again for The Guardian, Martin Skegg said "presumably it's meant to be funny, but you'll be searching high and low for the jokes." David Crawford writing for the Radio Times gave a highly positive review, saying "starting from a preposterous premise, this rambunctious comedy manages to get hearty, and frequently filthy, laughs from its unlikely situation. The humour is suitably broad for the subject matter, but there are neat gags, and wonderful physical comedy." Liam Murphy, writing for On the Box, gave a mixed review, saying "this is a sitcom with potential and as long as it avoids the trappings of most comedy pregnancies (see season 8 of Friends) then I might just watch the rest of the series!"

In January 2013, the British Comedy Guide gave the show the Comedy.co.uk Editors' Award saying: "We congratulate production company Big Talk and Comedy Central for giving this unique series the chance to grow. It seems to have boosted the channel's confidence in ordering more original comedy".

DVD and Blu-ray release
On 17 October 2011, BBC Worldwide, released the series to download on the iTunes Store. Then as of 12 November 2012, series 1 became available to purchase on DVD-Video through 2 Entertain.

On 1 October 2012, series 2 became available to download through iTunes. A release date of series 2 on DVD has yet to be confirmed by 2 Entertain.

References

External links

Comedy Central (British TV channel) original programming
2010s British sitcoms
2011 British television series debuts
2012 British television series endings
Television series by ITV Studios
Television series by Big Talk Productions
English-language television shows